Mike Phillips (born March 24, 1958) is an American politician and a former Democratic Party member of the Montana State Senate, representing District 31 from 2013 to 2021.

External links
Montana House of Representatives - Mike Phillips official MT State Legislature website
Project Vote Smart - Representative Mike Phillips (MT) profile

1958 births
21st-century American politicians
Living people
Democratic Party members of the Montana House of Representatives
Democratic Party Montana state senators
People from Charleston, Illinois
Politicians from Bozeman, Montana
University of Illinois alumni
University of Alaska Fairbanks alumni